Code page 1046 (CCSID 1046 and euro sign extended CCSID 9238), also known as Arabic Extended-Euro, is used by IBM platforms in Egypt, Iraq, Jordan, Saudi Arabia, and Syria for Arabic.

Codepage layout

References

1046